Gertrude Berman (July 3, 1924 – February 1, 2013) was an American Democratic Party politician from Long Branch, New Jersey who served in the New Jersey General Assembly from the 10th Legislative District from 1974 to 1976.

She died on February 1, 2013, in Newton, Massachusetts at age 88.

References

1924 births
2013 deaths
20th-century American politicians
20th-century American women politicians
New Jersey city council members
Democratic Party members of the New Jersey General Assembly
Politicians from Long Branch, New Jersey
Women state legislators in New Jersey
Women city councillors in New Jersey
Politicians from Newark, New Jersey
21st-century American women